Leif Klette (21 November 1927 – 3 April 2017) was a Norwegian épée and foil fencer. He competed at the 1952 and 1960 Summer Olympics. He became Norwegian champion twelve times between 1952 and 1970.

References

External links
 

1927 births
2017 deaths
Norwegian male épée fencers
Olympic fencers of Norway
Fencers at the 1952 Summer Olympics
Fencers at the 1960 Summer Olympics
Norwegian male foil fencers
20th-century Norwegian people